Sphalerostola argobela is a moth in the family Xyloryctidae. It was described by Edward Meyrick in 1931. It is found on New Guinea.

References

Xyloryctidae
Moths described in 1931